Jitendra Bhatnagar is an Indian first-class cricketer who represented Rajasthan. He made his first-class debut for Rajasthan in the 1963-64 Ranji Trophy on 9 November 1963.

References

External links
 

Living people
Indian cricketers
Rajasthan cricketers
Year of birth missing (living people)